Kelvin Lawrence (born November 12, 1973) is an American politician who has served in the Alabama House of Representatives from the 69th district since 2014.

References

External links

1973 births
Living people
Democratic Party members of the Alabama House of Representatives
21st-century American politicians
African-American state legislators in Alabama
People from Hayneville, Alabama